Lieutenant general (abbreviated as Lt. Gen.) is the second-highest rank of the Sri Lanka Army and generally it is the highest active rank as the Sri Lanka army do not have any appointment in the rank of full general but in the case of the appointment of Chief of Defence Staff, the rank of full general is given (if the chief is appointed from the army and not from the navy or the air force). It was created as a direct equivalent of the British military rank of lieutenant general, and is considered a three-star rank.

The rank of lieutenant general is held by the Commander of the Army. The rank was also held when an army officer served as the General Officer Commanding, Joint Operations Command between 1985 and 1991. 

Lieutenant-general is a superior rank to major-general, but subordinate to a full general, which is awarded to the Chief of the Defence Staff or as a ceremonial rank. The rank is equivalent to a vice-admiral in the Sri Lanka Navy and an air marshal in the Sri Lanka Air Force (SLAF) and the air forces of many Commonwealth countries. Unlike other ranks, a lieutenant-general does not have a maximum permissible service period to hold the rank before having to retire due to lack of promotion to the next rank.

Insignia
The rank insignia for rank is a Sri Lanka emblem over a crossed sabre and baton. The Gorget patches of the Lieutenant General officer pattern, three gold/silver stars on scarlet background with a gold/silver button; worn on Dress No 2A, 4, 5, 5A, 6, 6A, 6B, 7 and 8. The commander of the army of the rank of lieutenant general would have an oak leaf chain of two oak leaves in gold colour at the bottom of their gorget patches. The Gorget patches of the General Officers Large/Medium patterns, of gold colour braided (bullion wire) three oak leaves on scarlet background with a gold button, worn by the officers in the rank of major general and above for Dress No1, No 3 and 3A.

History

In 1974, then commander of the army, Sepala Attygalle was promoted to the rank of lieutenant-general. Since then all army commanders retired with the rank of lieutenant-general and Tissa Weeratunga and Cyril Ranatunga served as general officer commanding, Joint Operations Command with the rank of lieutenant-general. Ranatunga was appointed directly to the rank of lieutenant-general, without holding the rank of major-general having been recalled from retirement. Since 1986, the serving commander of the army held the rank of  lieutenant-general. Since 1991, it became customary for all commanders of the army to be promoted to the rank of general on the final day of service if they were retiring or appointed as Chief of the Defence Staff. In 2007, two former commanders of the army were also promoted to the rank of general. In addition to officers appointed as Army Commander or GOC, Joint Operations Command; four officers of the rank of major general have been promoted to the rank of lieutenant general; three of these have been promoyed posthumously as these officers either had been killed in action or assassinated.

List of lieutenant generals
Lieutenant General Denzil Kobbekaduwa (Promoted posthumously)
Lieutenant General Parami Kulatunga (Promoted posthumously)
Lieutenant General Nalin Angammana (Promoted posthumously)
Lieutenant General Henry Athukorale (Retired - deceased)
Lieutenant General Vikum Liyanage

See also
Sri Lanka Army ranks and insignia
Sri Lanka Navy rank insignia
Sri Lanka Air Force rank insignia
Sri Lanka Army
Military of Sri Lanka
Comparative military ranks
Military rank

References

Army, Sri Lanka. (1st Edition - October 1999). "50 YEARS ON" - 1949-1999, Sri Lanka Army.

External links 
Sri Lanka Army
Ministry of Defence, Public Security, Law & Order - Democratic Socialist Republic of Sri Lanka
Three Service Commanders promoted : Official Government News Portal 

Military ranks of the Sri Lanka Army
lieutenant generals